The Society for the Promotion of Hellenic Studies, known as the Hellenic Society, was founded in 1879 to advance the study of Greek language, literature, history, art and archaeology in the Ancient, Byzantine and Modern periods. The first President was J. B. Lightfoot, the biblical scholar and Bishop of Durham. Ioannis Gennadius helped found it.

The Society has done this ever since by various means, chief among them being the annual publication of the Journal of Hellenic Studies and, since the 1950s, its supplement, Archaeological Reports, which are both supplied free of charge to members and subscribers of the Society. Occasional monographs have also appeared in the series Supplementary Papers; this series has now been replaced by the Society's Occasional Publications.

Work

The Society is based, together with the Society for the Promotion of Roman Studies, in the premises of the Institute of Classical Studies of the University of London at the Senate House (University of London).

The Society maintains the Joint Library, in conjunction with the Roman Society, which is integrated into a Combined Library with that of the Institute of Classical Studies.

The Society arranges an annual lecture series in London, conferences, receptions and other meetings, and helps to arrange other lectures all around the UK in collaboration with the local branches of the Classical Association. The Society holds a list of lecturers on topics in Hellenic Studies, which is supplied to Classical Association branches, classical teacher groups, and other organisations to help them plan their own lecture programmes.

The Society aims to help those engaged in Hellenic Studies at all levels, and to this end it makes grants of various kinds to schools, universities and other institutions, undergraduates, graduate students and young researchers.

Officers
These were the officers of the Hellenic Society in 2019-2020:

President: Professor Paul Cartledge
Vice-Presidents: Professor P.E. Easterling, FBA; Professor Robert Fowler, FBA; Mr Brian Gilmore; Mr. George Lemos; Dr Pantelis Michelakis; Professor R. G. Osborne, FBA; Professor C. J. Rowe; Professor K.B. Saunders, MD, DSc, FRCP; Professor Malcolm Schofield, FBA; Professor B. A. Sparkes; Dr David Thomas
Hon. Treasurer: Mr Peter Lennon
Hon. Secretary: Dr Margaret Mountford
Executive Secretary: Dr Fiona Haarer
Membership Officer: Dr Stephen Harrison

Presidents
List of presidents since 1879:

 The Right Revd. J. B. Lightfoot  1879-1890
 Professor Sir Richard Jebb  1890-1905
 Professor Percy Gardner  1905-1910
 Sir Arthur Evans  1910-1914
 Walter Leaf  1914-1919
 Sir Frederic Kenyon  1919-1924
 Arthur Hamilton Smith  1924-1929
 George Macmillan (Acting)  1928-1929
 Professor Ernest Gardner  1929-1932
 Professor R. M. Dawkins  1932-1935
 Sir John Myres  1935-1938
 Sir Richard Livingstone  1938-1941
 Sir Arthur Pickard-Cambridge  1941-1945
 Professor Gilbert Murray  1945-1948
 Professor E. R. Dodds  1948-1951
 Professor T. B. L. Webster  1951-1954
 Professor Dorothy Tarrant  1954-1956
 Professor A. W. Gomme  1956-1959
 Professor R. P. Winnington-Ingram  1959-1962
 Professor A. Andrewes  1962-1965
 Professor N. G. L. Hammond  1965-1968
 Professor E. G. Turner  1968-1971
 Sir Kenneth Dover  1971-1974
 Professor R. Browning 1974-1977
 Professor G. S. Kirk  1977-1980
 Professor P. E. Corbett  1980-1983
 Professor G. B. Kerferd  1983-1986
 Sir David Hunt  1986-1990
 Professor J. P. Barron  1990-1993
 Professor E. W. Handley  1993-1996
 Professor P. E. Easterling  1996-1999
 Professor C. J. Rowe  1999-2002
 Professor R. G. Osborne  2002-2006
 Professor C. B. R. Pelling  2006-2008
 Professor Malcolm Schofield  2008-2011
 Professor Chris Carey  2011-2014
 Professor Robert Fowler 2014-2017
 Professor Judith Mossman 2017- 2020
 Professor Paul Cartledge 2020 - current

References

George A. Macmillan, An Outline of the History of the Society for the Promotion of Hellenic Studies, 1879-1904, London.  Online here.
P. T. Stevens, The Society for the Promotion of Hellenic Studies, 1879-1979. A Historical Sketch, [London].

External links

Hellenic Society tumblr site
Joint Library of the Hellenic and Roman Societies

Historiography of Greece
Learned societies of the United Kingdom
Organizations established in 1879
Charities based in London
1879 establishments in the United Kingdom